Gateways is the seventh volume in a series of Repairman Jack books written by American author F. Paul Wilson. The book was first published by Gauntlet Press in a signed limited first edition (2003) then later as a trade hardcover from Forge (November 2003) and a mass market paperback from Forge (February 2006).

2003 American novels
Repairman Jack (series)